The Premier League International Cup is an English football competition for U23 players from across Europe. It was designed to provide players in English Category One academies with the opportunity to match themselves against other elite European footballers from their age group in a competitive environment. The competition was created by the Premier League as part of the organisation's Elite Player Performance Plan and is not sanctioned by UEFA.

Overview
The competition features U23 sides from twelve English clubs and twelve other European clubs for the 2017–18 season. Prior the 2016–17 season, eight English and eight other European clubs competed in the competition. English teams qualify via their standing in the Premier League 2 and entry by European clubs is by invitation from the Premier League. For the 2014–15 tournament the 16 teams were split into four groups of four. Upon completion of the group stages the winners and runners-up from each group progressed to the quarter-finals, semi-finals and final, all played as single-leg ties. UEFA tried to block the creation of the tournament and refused to sanction its creation, to circumvent this all games will be hosted in England with games involving two foreign teams being held in neutral venues. English clubs will play a minimum of two of their fixtures at the main stadium of their senior side. To ensure the focus is on development, the Premier League made no prize money available for the competition.

As in the Professional U21 Development League, teams are allowed to field three overage outfield players and one overage goalkeeper per match.

The most successful team is Porto with two titles. Porto won the trophy in two consecutive seasons by beating Sunderland on 17 May 2017 and Arsenal on 8 May 2018.

Finals

Performances

By club

By nation

Top scorers by season

See also
 UEFA Youth League
 NextGen Series

References

 
Youth football cup competitions in England
International Cup
Under-23 association football
Recurring sporting events established in 2014
2014 establishments in England
Multi-national association football leagues in Europe